Piscobamba (from Quechua Pisqupampa, pisqu, p'isqu bird, pampa plain) is a town in central Peru. It is the capital of the Mariscal Luzuriaga Province in the  Ancash Region.

References

Populated places in the Ancash Region